Miltochrista rosacea is a moth of the family Erebidae. It was described by Otto Vasilievich Bremer in 1861. It is found in the Russian Far East (Middle Amur, Primorye), Korea and China (Hebei, Shanxi, Shaanxi, Hunan, Yunan, Fujiang, Zhejiang, Tibet).

References

 Arctiidae genus list at Butterflies and Moths of the World of the Natural History Museum

rosacea
Moths described in 1861
Moths of Asia